René Tremblay,  (November 12, 1922 – January 22, 1968) was a Canadian politician.

Born in Luceville, Quebec, he was first elected to the House of Commons of Canada representing the riding of Matapédia—Matane in the 1963 federal election. A Liberal, he was re-elected in 1965. From 1963 to 1964, he was a Minister without Portfolio. From 1964 to 1965, he was the Minister of Citizenship and Immigration. In 1965, he was the Postmaster General. He died of a heart attack at the age of forty-five on Monday, January 22, 1968.

External links

1922 births
1968 deaths
Liberal Party of Canada MPs
Members of the House of Commons of Canada from Quebec
Members of the King's Privy Council for Canada
Academic staff of Université Laval